MEGA shopping centres are managed and operated by IKEA Centres Russia, part of the IKEA Group. MEGA provides about 1.735 million sqm of retail space, and more than half of its tenants are represented by international retailers. There are a total of 14 MEGA centres, which are located in Russia's 11 largest cities with more than 250 million visitors annually.

IKEA Centres Russia 
IKEA Centre Russia is part of IKEA Centres, which is IKEA Group's global shopping centre company. Present in China, Europe – including Nordic countries – and Russia, IKEA Centres owns and operates 41 shopping centre and 25 retail parks in 14 countries. The global annual footfall to the company's shopping centres is 400 million visitors.

IKEA Centres Russia is the largest developer on the Russian market. 14 MEGA branded shopping centres are located in Russia's 11 largest cities with more than 250 million visitors annually.  Each centre comprises circa 124,000 sq m with approximately 200 stores each.

IKEA Centres in Russia :

 14 MEGA shopping centers
 11 Russian cities
 RUB 98 billion investment
 2,2 million sq.m overall retail space
 250 million visitors per year
 2,1 billion visitors since the first MEGA opening
 over 1000 co-workers
 123.960 sqm average GLA of each MEGA shopping center (1.735.000 sqm total)
 97% brand awareness level in the cities of presence

Development in Russia 
 2002 — the first shopping centre, MEGA Teply Stan, opening in Moscow.
 2004 — MEGA Khimki shopping centre opening in Moscow; includes the first Russian IKEA store opened in 2000.
 2005 — MEGA shopping centre opening in Kazan.
 2006 — MEGA shopping centres opening in Yekaterinburg, Nizhniy Novgorod and Vsevolozhsk district, Leningrad region (MEGA Dybenko and MEGA Parnas).
 2006 — First phase’ opening of MEGA Belaya Dacha in Kotelniki (Moscow Region).
 2007 — MEGA opening in Rostov-on-Don and Novosibirsk.
 2007 — Second phase’ opening of MEGA Belaya Dacha.
 2008 — MEGA opening in Adygea Republic.
 2009 — MEGA shopping centre opening in Omsk.
 2011 — MEGA shopping centres opening in Ufa and Samara.
 2014 — Russia investment plans announced, the investment amount exceeds RUB 100 billion. The money will be spent on the commercial upgrade in the existing shopping centres and new shopping centres development.
 2022 — In a response to the 2022 full-scale Russian invasion of Ukraine, IKEA closed on a temporary basis but stated that it kept the MEGA shopping centres open to "ensure that ... people ... [had] access to ... food, groceries and pharmacies."

Khimki fire

On 9 December 2022, a major fire started in the MEGA shopping centre in Khimki, burning  of the centre, with one death. Local authorities stated that the fire was not the result of arson. A criminal investigation based on safety violations was opened into the incident.

List of MEGA malls

Products and services

Anchor tenants 

Having IKEA as an anchor, MEGA centres are supported by other anchors such as Auchan, OBI, Leroy Merlin, M.Video, MediaMarkt and Decathlon.

Brands 

Typically MEGA shopping centre has more than 70% foreign retailers including western brands such as GAP, Banana Republic, Tommy Hilfiger, Starbucks, Victoria's Secret Beauty & Accessories, Steve Madden, Zara, H&M, Marks & Spencer, Next, Karen Millen, Accessorize and many more. Russian tenants in MEGA include Sportmaster, L’Etoile, Gloria Jeans, TVOE, Carlo Pazolini etc.

In 2015, 90 brands chose MEGA as a partner to launch and develop business in Russia including DeFacto, Pimkie, Wrangler and Popbar. Also in 2015, a number of Russian and international brands grew their presence in MEGA shopping centers such as L’Etoile, TVOE, Carlo Pazolini, Mango, Colins, Finn Flare, Adidas, KFC, McDonald's. Detsky Mir, Econika, Calvin Klein Jeans, Triumph, Karen Millen and other brands presented renewed store concepts.

Food courts 

In 2014, the company announced plans for the food courts renovations and a new concept launch for cafes and restaurants in MEGAs. The project was part of the global modernisation programme in MEGA shopping centers.

Within the renewed format, cafes and restaurants are united in one space with a sitting area and leisure and entertainment zones.

In December 2015, MEGA Teply Stan finished a massive reconstruction of the food court.

Within the commercial upgrade programme in the shopping centers and food courts reconstruction, in 2016 MEGA shopping centers opened new cafes and restaurants: Correa's, ObedBufet (Ginza Project), Kitchennete, Krispy Kreme, Menza, Zotman Pizza Pie and others. MEGA Khimki opened the largest culinary studio by Julia Vysotskaya and a unique farmer market MEGA FARM LavkaLavka. MEGA Teply Stan opened a US Magnolia Bakery.

Financial results 

In 2015 financial year, the footfall to MEGA shopping centers was 275 million visitors. On average, MEGA shopping centers in Moscow are visited by 35 million customers per year.

The overall tenant sales in 2015 financial year were RUB 362 billion. Based on the results of the 2015 financial year, the share of free space (on average in all MEGA centers) is 1.4 %.

References

External links 

 Official site 
 Official site 

Shopping malls in Russia
IKEA